Yuliya Pavlovich-Yelsakova (born 13 December 1978) is a Belarusian short track speed skater. She competed at the 2002 Winter Olympics and the 2006 Winter Olympics.

References

External links
 

1978 births
Living people
Belarusian female short track speed skaters
Olympic short track speed skaters of Belarus
Short track speed skaters at the 2002 Winter Olympics
Short track speed skaters at the 2006 Winter Olympics
Sportspeople from Vitebsk